Miroslav Macháček (May 8, 1922 – February 17, 1991) was a Czech theatre director and an actor.

Life and career 
Miroslav Macháček was born in Nymburk. His father was a car painter and a custodian of the theater in Nymburk and sometimes worked as an actor and director where young Miroslav could experience many famous Czech actors who were guests in the theater.  His father enrolled Miroslav in a high school, but he was expelled after few years and had to return to an elementary school. After graduation, he went to a trade high school where he learned to become a  hammerman in the Aero factory.  During his studies he took part in evening theater rehearsals in Prague and met in person some famous actors such as Jiří Sovák, Martin Růžek, Václav Voska etc.   He decided to try to enroll into a Theatre College, he passed the admission exam but all of this happened at the time when the higher level schools in the Protectorate of Bohemia and Moravia were closing down. He entered the school after the war (Miloš Nedbal was his teacher) and graduated in 1948.   At the time of his studies he was so poor that he had to sleep in the college building (Rudolfinum) but later he lived with his colleagues (e.g. Stanislav Remunda).  After graduation, he worked in the Pardubice Theater and in 1950 he moved to Prague and started working for Realist Theater and DAMU (Theater Conservatory).  A year later he was accused of revolting and spy contacts and was fired from the Theater as well as from the College.   He had to write an obligatory heart-searching confession. As a consequence he suffered from depression and even tried to commit suicide, but eventually left Prague for České Budějovice to work in the local Theatre.  In 1956 (the time of the 20th Congress of the Communist Party of the Soviet Union) he returned to Prague and in 1959 he started his career in the most prestigious Theater in the country – National Theater.   He was a constituent member of the Činoherní klub (1965). In April 1969 he left the Communist Party of Czechoslovakia and had much trouble with secret police that constantly intruded and interrupted his professional work as a theater director and an actor. Among others in the National Theater in Prague he successfully staged Shakespeare's Henry V; his success was remarkable because audience rightfully understood this play was making fun of communists. Authorities claimed to be an anti-communist play/translation by Břetislav Hodek and Macháček as a director was accused of disrespect for the Communist Party and then the communist government of Czechoslovakia. As a punishment he had to stop working for Czech Television and was no longer allowed to participate on a work on movies. Non the less he managed to successfully stage twenty nine plays from different drama authors. He also contributed as an actor, where he played in over thirty roles, often in dramas he directed. In 1975 he made a critical speech in the National Theatre (after the Opening Night of the Optimistic Tragedy by Vsevolod Vishnevskiy) and as a result of his disregard for the communist government he was forced by authorities to begin a treatment in a Psychiatric Asylum in Bohnice where he spent 117 days. After his dismissal he came back to National Theatre and directed most of his masterpieces, among them Naši Furianti by Ladislav Stroupežnický (Opening Night on 13 May 1979), often considered to be the best staging of the Czechoslovak Theater in a post-war history. He retired on 1 January 1989 but he took actively part in the Velvet Revolution.

Miroslav Macháček was married to Věra Štiborová in 1949 with whom he has got a daughter Kateřina Macháčková, an actress.   His was not a happy marriage and he divorced his wife when he met Ester Krumbachová, an actress, in České Budějovice.  They parted in the early 1960s and Macháček started a relationship with Jana Břežková.   His daughter Kateřina Macháčková edited her father's notes from the hospital under the name of the Notes from a Madhouse (Zápisky z blázince, 1995).   Her own 300-page biographical book about her father will come out in 2009.

Film 
Miroslav Macháček played roles in Czech films:

Ďáblova past (František Vláčil 1961)
Valley of the Bees (1967)
Love Between the Raindrops (1979)
Stín kapradiny (František Vláčil, 1984)
Skalpel, prosím (Jiří Svoboda, 1985).
Wolf's Hole (1987)

References 

1922 births
1991 deaths
Czech male stage actors
Czech theatre directors
People from Nymburk
20th-century Czech male actors
Czechoslovak male actors
Prague Conservatory alumni